Lost And Found is a two-disc album that includes demos and live recordings by the Byron Band which spans two years from 1980–1982. It also includes a Robin George solo track.

Track listing
All songs by David Byron and Robin George, except where indicated.
Disc One

Writing Demos Live in London '82
"Learn the Dance"
"I Need Love"
"Fool for a Pretty Face"
"Safety in Numbers"
"Bad Girl"
"One Minute More"

Demo Live Worcester '82

"Bad Girl"

Writing at David's House '82

"She Was Good"
"Fool for a Pretty Face"
"She Was a Dream"
"She Got Pride"
"Untitled Melody"
"Learn the Dance"

Disc Two

Rehearsals London '81

"How Do You Sleep?"
"Safety in Numbers"
"I Need Love"
"Piece of My Love"
"Goodnight Blues"
"Last Chance Jam"

Live in Liverpool '80

"Bad Girl"
"Start Believing"
"July Morning" (Ken Hensley, Byron)
"How Do You Sleep"
"Sweet Lorraine" (Byron, Mick Box, Gary Thain)
"Piece of My Love"
"Liverpool Blues"
"Roll Over Beethoven" (Chuck Berry)

Robin George Solo Track

"Angelsong" (George)

Personnel
David Byron - lead vocals
Robin George - guitars and background vocals
Roger Flavelle, Pino Palladino -  bass guitars
Steve Braye, Pete Thompson, Charlie Morgan, John Searer - drums
Bob Jackson, Pete Green - keyboards
Mel Collins - saxophone
Chris Thompson - backing vocals

Production
Gus Dudgeon - producer
Robin George - mastering
Charlie Charlesworth - cover design
Debra Derryn - paintings

References

2003 albums
David Byron albums
Albums produced by Gus Dudgeon